Amphibious reconnaissance is ground and naval reconnaissance in the littoral area bordering coastal or ocean areas. Initially, it is used for preliminary reconnaissance in collecting pertinent information about the beachhead in its permeability and usability for main landing assaults. Specialized recon patrols skilled in boatswain and combatant diving using either amphibious vehicles or rubber crafts to obtain and collect information on the enemy, the topology ashore and inland, and hydrographic surveys for underwater obstacles and mines, and for the purpose of affecting a deception.

History

Evolution of the doctrine 

The turn of the 20th century, amphibious reconnaissance was first conceived from an idea from a United States Marine officer by then-Major Dion Williams. Williams referenced the purpose of amphibious reconnaissance by standardizing the 'official' naval doctrine of amphibious reconnaissance of American amphibious warfare in 1906. The scope of the doctrine outlined every aspect that involved recognition of intelligence gathering and planning, the cornerstone of America's present-day methods in amphibious reconnaissance.

Although very little effect was made in creating a formidable unit capable of utilizing amphibious reconnaissance tactics in the outset of World War I and the Gallipoli Operations due to the lack of Marine Corps personnel by the United States isolationism of the 1920-30s. Also drawbacks concurred while most of the Marine forces were engaged in conflicts in China and in Nicaragua.  By 1933, December 7, when the Fleet Marine Force was formed at Headquarters Marine Corps at Marine Corps Base Quantico, VA combining the roles of the United States Navy and United States Marine Corps into an integrated naval assault force. Shortly after, a new naval doctrine, the Fleet Training Publication 167 was created to ensure long-term purposes.

With this new amphibious reconnaissance doctrine, the United States Navy and Marine Corps began to consider establishing reconnaissance units. The origins of reconnaissance within the United States Marine Corps had evolved from an idea by Major Dion Williams who, in 1906, wrote the first American doctrine concerning amphibious reconnaissance. He specified in his thesis that "...talented and experienced men should be assigned to this work, listing among the requisite qualities a thorough technical knowledge, a quick and energetic nature to ensure the work is accomplished without unnecessary delay, a sufficient resourcefulness to overcome unexpected obstacles, a reticence to ensure results are kept confidential, and above all, exactitude of work".

These Marines particularly needed to be competent in surveying, cartography, and recording observations, as well as reading previous maps and surveys of various types.

Williams' doctrine outlined a wide spectrum of reconnaissance, which consisted of range determination, topography, configuration of the ground, cities, towns, roads, trails, railroads, telegraph cables, telephone lines, wireless telegraphy, rivers, canals, resources (coal, repair facilities, land transportation, electric plants, food supplies, water supply, and hospitals), conditions of the harbor and harbor steamers, wharves, docks, water service, the population (secret service, professions and occupations, naval and military forces), existing defenses (location, form and description, armament, fieldworks, mines and mine fields, searchlights, plans and sketches, garrisons and forces available, methods of attack, adaptability of the defenses). And the most important he listed was hydrographic reconnaissance:

In order to prepare intelligent plans for the attack or defense of a harbor or bay, it is necessary to have at hand a comprehensive description of the hydrographic features and accurate charts showing the depths of water at all points, the reefs, rocks, shoals, and peculiar currents which constitute dangers to navigation, and the tributary streams and channels which may form avenues of attack or furnish anchorages for a portion of the floating defenses or auxiliaries of the defenders.

After World War I, three significant aspects of the second edition of Williams' Naval Reconnaissance included (1) discussion of additional capabilities of observation from airplanes and submarines, (2) promulgation of the book under authority of the Secretary of the Navy instead of under the auspices of the President of the Naval War College, and (3) emphasis on information acquisition for long-term planning. It was this latter emphasis on obtaining information long before hostilities that was perhaps of greatest significance. Rather than obtaining information solely for military operations in progress, Williams now enunciated a more comprehensive mission:

The object of the naval reconnaissance of any given locality is to acquire all of the information concerning the sea, land, air and material resources of that locality, with a view to its use by the Navy in peace and war, and to record this information that it may be most readily available for: the preparation of plans for the occupation of the locality as a temporary or permanent naval base; the preparation of plans for the sea and land defense of the locality when used as such a base; or the preparation of plans for the attack of the locality by sea and land should it be in possession of an enemy.

Twenty years later, another Marine Intelligence Officer, Earl H. Ellis, put most of William's concept to effect. After fighting in the trenches in World War I, Ellis submitted a request to Headquarters Marine Corps for special intelligence duty in South America and the Pacific; the Director of Naval Intelligence diligently accepted. It was during his special duty that introduced the most profound accounts of Ellis's intelligence reports. He submitted a 30,000 page Top Secret document concerning his detail discussion of local sea, air and the climate, various land terrain types, the native population and economic conditions. He discussed his reports on strategically seizing key islands as forward-operating bases for project naval forces effectively into the area. His time-tables, mobilization projections, and predictions of manpower necessary to seize certain targets.

The earliest activities in amphibious reconnaissance was largely limited in surveying of ports, uncharted islands and adjacent beaches or coastlines. Most of these duties were billeted by senior Naval Intelligence Officers that were prerequisited in topography, hydrography, impermanent construction of fortification with the means of rapid encampment and mobilization of troops to operate in their area.

World War II in Europe 

The development of amphibious reconnaissance in the early stages of the Second World War during the European campaigns were largely dominated by Lt. Commander Nigel Clogstoun-Willmot RN, who developed what would become the Combined Operations Pilotage Parties (COPPs) while conducting raids on the Aegean Islands in 1941. Following Operation Torch, which was carried out without proper reconnaissance, it was proposed that 50 of these parties would be needed; however, the shortage of necessary personnel meant that in all only eleven teams were trained. The Beach Pilotage School was set up on the Kyles of Bute in Scotland.

The COPP Depot was set up in 1943 on Hayling Island based at Hayling Island Sailing Club. In preparation for the invasion of Normandy, the British carried out Operation Postage Able, in which a midget submarine took a team close in to the planned landing sites. The team took samples from the beach to determine its ability to bear vehicles, and, together with depth soundings and other observations, large-scale models of the beaches were constructed to aid planning. In addition, American combat swimmer teams from Naval Combat Demolition Units conducted nighttime reconnaissance on possible landing sites, mapping underwater obstacles and helping to clear obstacles during the invasion. 

Following the war, the secrecy surrounding beach recce continued, and mention of the COPPs did not appear in the press until the late 1950s. By then their knowledge and role had been passed on to the (then) Special Boat Squadron.

Mission role 

Specific missions for amphibious reconnaissance patrols included:

To determine characteristics of beaches available for landing, and report same to commander at sea.
By hydrographic reconnaissance of water near the shore line.
By examining terrain in immediate vicinity of beach.
By noting beach defenses, such as wire, mines, and other obstacles; troops in immediate vicinity; other defenses.
To report landmarks for assisting in locating landing beaches.
To mark beaches and landing points during landing.
To determine location, strength, and composition of troops in landing area.
To take and hold in concealment a prisoner or prisoners and be prepared to turn them over to Headquarters Landing Force.
To spot observers to report enemy activity by radio or by panel.
To determine road net and be prepared to meet and guide elements of landing force.
To determine practicability of terrain for air landings.
After the beachhead has been established, to contour the sea floor beginning at the ten-foot line and using a two-foot contour interval in order to expedite the unloading of supplies by locating most advantageous channels and beaches.

Also assigned were the following non-intelligence missions:

To create a diversion from proposed landing point.
Minor night attacks.
To assist a landing by executing light demolitions.
To disrupt enemy communications by wire cutting and jamming radios.
To set flares for naval gunfire at night, or to smoke a beach in order to screen a landing wave, or to otherwise mislead the enemy.

See also
Hydrographic survey

References 

Military intelligence collection
Reconnaissance